Alexandria Township is a township in Hunterdon County, in the U.S. state of New Jersey. As of the 2020 United States census, the township's population was 4,809, a decrease of 129 (−2.6%) from the 2010 census count of 4,938, which in turn reflected an increase of 240 (+5.1%) from the 4,698 counted in the 2000 census.

Alexandria was formed by Royal charter on March 5, 1765, from portions of Bethlehem Township, and was incorporated as one of New Jersey's initial 104 townships by an act of the New Jersey Legislature on February 21, 1798. Portions of the township were taken to form Frenchtown (April 4, 1867), Holland Township (April 13, 1874, restored to Alexandria on March 4, 1878, and recreated on March 11, 1879) and Milford (April 15, 1911). The township was named for James Alexander, a surveyor who served as New Jersey Attorney General and who had acquired  of land in the area in 1744.

Geography
According to the United States Census Bureau, the township had a total area of 27.75 square miles (71.87 km2), including 27.53 square miles (71.31 km2) of land and 0.22 square miles (0.56 km2) of water (0.79%).

Unincorporated communities, localities and place names located partially or completely within the township include Everittstown, Little York, Mechlings Corner, Mount Pleasant, Mount Salem, Palmyra and Swinesburg. Pittstown is an unincorporated community that is also spread across Franklin Township and Union Township.

The township borders the municipalities of Bethlehem Township, Franklin Township, Frenchtown, Holland Township, Kingwood Township, Milford and Union Township in Hunterdon County; and both Bridgeton Township and Tinicum Township in Bucks County across the Delaware River border with the Commonwealth of Pennsylvania.

Demographics

2010 census

The Census Bureau's 2006–2010 American Community Survey showed that (in 2010 inflation-adjusted dollars) median household income was $117,404 (with a margin of error of +/− $11,426) and the median family income was $137,821 (+/− $24,473). Males had a median income of $101,927 (+/− $22,844) versus $60,875 (+/− $7,233) for females. The per capita income for the borough was $47,777 (+/− $5,059). About 3.0% of families and 3.3% of the population were below the poverty line, including 2.9% of those under age 18 and 3.1% of those age 65 or over.

2000 census
As of the 2000 United States census there were 4,698 people, 1,535 households, and 1,290 families residing in the township.  The population density was 170.6 people per square mile (65.9/km2).  There were 1,598 housing units at an average density of 58.0 per square mile (22.4/km2).  The racial makeup of the township was 97.02% White, 0.79% African American, 0.11% Native American, 0.72% Asian, 0.04% Pacific Islander, 0.45% from other races, and 0.87% from two or more races. Hispanic or Latino of any race were 1.72% of the population.

There were 1,535 households, out of which 42.9% had children under the age of 18 living with them, 77.9% were married couples living together, 4.4% had a female householder with no husband present, and 15.9% were non-families. 13.5% of all households were made up of individuals, and 5.2% had someone living alone who was 65 years of age or older. The average household size was 2.95 and the average family size was 3.25.

In the township the population was spread out, with 28.1% under the age of 18, 4.9% from 18 to 24, 27.1% from 25 to 44, 27.8% from 45 to 64, and 12.1% who were 65 years of age or older.  The median age was 40 years. For every 100 females, there were 100.3 males.  For every 100 females age 18 and over, there were 95.0 males.

The median income for a household in the township was $92,730, and the median income for a family was $93,619. Males had a median income of $70,996 versus $39,904 for females. The per capita income for the township was $34,622.  About 4.3% of families and 5.0% of the population were below the poverty line, including 7.7% of those under age 18 and 2.7% of those age 65 or over.

Government

Local government 
Alexandria Township is governed under the Township form of New Jersey municipal government, one of 141 municipalities (of the 564) statewide that use this form, the second-most commonly used form of government in the state. The governing body is comprised of a five-member Township Committee, whose members are elected directly by the voters at-large in partisan elections to serve three-year terms of office on a staggered basis, with one seat coming up for election each year as part of the November general election in a three-year cycle. At an annual reorganization meeting, the Township Committee selects one of its members to serve as mayor and another as deputy mayor.

In the November 2020 general election, a ballot question was approved that asked voters if they wanted to expand the township committee from three members to five. In November 2021, voters chose two candidates to serve three-year terms and one to serve a two-year term, so that there were five members elected to the Township Committee starting in January 2022.

, members of the Alexandria Township Committee are Mayor Gabriel C. "Gabe" Plumer (R, term on committee and as mayor ends December 31, 2022), Deputy Mayor Rudolph C. "Chris" Pfefferle (R, term on committee ends 2024; term as deputy mayor ends 2022), Jay M. Arancio (2024), James P. Kiernan (R, 2023) and Robert Mortara (2022).

In September 2015, the Township Committee selected Michelle Garay from three candidates nominated by the Republican municipal committee to fill the vacant seat expiring in December 2016 that had been held by Harry Swift until his death in office earlier that month.

Christian Pfefferle took office in November 2014 after running unopposed to fill the 14 months remaining in the term of the seat that had been vacated by Gabe Plummer when he resigned after he had moved outside of the township in January 2014; Curtis Schick had filled the seat on an interim basis.

Federal, state and county representation 
Alexandria Township is located in the 7th Congressional district and is part of New Jersey's 23rd state legislative district.

Politics
Like most municipalities in Hunterdon County, the township leans very strongly towards the Republican Party on the national and state levels. As of March 2011, there were a total of 3,411 registered voters in Alexandria Township, of which 533 (15.6%) were registered as Democrats, 1,458 (42.7%) were registered as Republicans and 1,417 (41.5%) were registered as Unaffiliated. There were 3 voters registered as Libertarians or Greens.

In the 2012 presidential election, Republican Mitt Romney received 64.4% of the vote (1,695 cast), ahead of Democrat Barack Obama with 34.1% (899 votes), and other candidates with 1.5% (39 votes), among the 2,651 ballots cast by the township's 3,571 registered voters (18 ballots were spoiled), for a turnout of 74.2%. In the 2008 presidential election, Republican John McCain received 60.2% of the vote here (1,643 cast), ahead of Democrat Barack Obama with 37.4% (1,019 votes) and other candidates with 1.8% (48 votes), among the 2,728 ballots cast by the township's 3,378 registered voters, for a turnout of 80.8%. In the 2004 presidential election, Republican George W. Bush received 65.9% of the vote here (1,665 ballots cast), outpolling Democrat John Kerry with 36.2% (916 votes) and other candidates with 0.9% (28 votes), among the 2,528 ballots cast by the township's 3,030 registered voters, for a turnout percentage of 83.4.

In the 2013 gubernatorial election, Republican Chris Christie received 78.7% of the vote (1,332 cast), ahead of Democrat Barbara Buono with 19.6% (332 votes), and other candidates with 1.7% (28 votes), among the 1,726 ballots cast by the township's 3,588 registered voters (34 ballots were spoiled), for a turnout of 48.1%. In the 2009 gubernatorial election, Republican Chris Christie received 72.3% of the vote here (1,520 ballots cast), ahead of Democrat Jon Corzine with 18.5% (388 votes), Independent Chris Daggett with 6.7% (140 votes) and other candidates with 1.2% (25 votes), among the 2,102 ballots cast by the township's 3,386 registered voters, yielding a 62.1% turnout.

Education 
The Alexandria Township School District serves students in pre-kindergarten through eighth grade. As of the 2021–22 school year, the district, comprised of two schools, had an enrollment of 461 students and 49.0 classroom teachers (on an FTE basis), for a student–teacher ratio of 9.4:1. The two schools in the district (with 2021–22 enrollment data from the National Center for Education Statistics) are 
Lester D. Wilson School with 187 students in pre-kindergarten through third grade and 
Alexandria Middle School with 269 students in grades four through eight.

Students in public school for ninth through twelfth grades attend Delaware Valley Regional High School, together with students from Frenchtown, Holland Township, Kingwood Township and Milford. The school is part of the Delaware Valley Regional High School District. As of the 2021–22 school year, the high school had an enrollment of 719 students and 62.5 classroom teachers (on an FTE basis), for a student–teacher ratio of 11.5:1. Seats on the high school district's nine-member board of education are allocated based on the populationof the constituent municipalities, with two seats assigned to Alexandria Township.

The Alexandria Township Education Foundation, is a non-profit organization established in 1997, whose mission is to help achieve and maintain an extra margin of excellence by employing private resources to supplement traditional school district funding.

Eighth grade students from all of Hunterdon County are eligible to apply to attend the high school programs offered by the Hunterdon County Vocational School District, a county-wide vocational school district that offers career and technical education at its campuses in Raritan Township and at programs sited at local high schools, with no tuition charged to students for attendance.

Transportation
Alexandria Field Airport is a privately owned public-use general aviation airport located in the geographic center of the township.

Roads and highways

No Interstate, U.S. or State routes pass through the township. The most significant roads to pass through Alexandria are County Route 513  (Everittstown Road), CR 519 and CR 579 (which only runs along the northeast border).

Interstate 78 is the closest limited access road which is accessible outside the municipality in bordering Union and Franklin Townships.

Wineries
 Beneduce Vineyards
 Mount Salem Vineyards

Notable people

People who were born in, residents of, or otherwise closely associated with Alexandria Township include:

 Carla Katz (born 1959), union leader
 Frank Muehlheuser (1926–2006), American football fullback and linebacker who played in the NFL for the Boston Yanks and the New York Bulldogs
 Jayson Williams (born 1968), former NBA player with the New Jersey Nets and Philadelphia 76ers, who owned an estate that featured a private basketball court, a personalized movie theatre and many other features

References

External links

Official Township website
Alexandria NJ website
Alexandria Township School District

School Data for the Alexandria Township School District, National Center for Education Statistics
Delaware Valley Regional High School District
Hunterdon Land Trust

 
1798 establishments in New Jersey
Populated places established in 1798
Township form of New Jersey government
Townships in Hunterdon County, New Jersey
New Jersey populated places on the Delaware River